Alfred Lucas may refer to:

 A. P. Lucas (1857–1923), English cricketer
 Alfred Lucas (chemist) (1867–1945), English analytical chemist, best known for his part in the excavation of Tutankhamun's tomb
 Alfred Lucas (Indian Army officer) (1822–1896), British staff officer in the British Indian Army